Aristida warburgii is a species of grass (in the family Poaceae) that is native to New South Wales and Queensland. It was first described by Carl Christian Mez in 1921 from a specimen collected near Maryborough, Queensland. The species epithet, warburgii, honours  Otto Warburg.

Description
A warburgii is a tufted perennial, growing from 30 to 90 cm high. The internodes are smooth. The iInflorescences are from 11 to 15 cm long and 2–7 cm wide, and carry spikelets from the base. It flowers and fruits all year round, growing on sandy soils in both Eucalyptus and Melaleuca communities.

See also
List of Aristida species

References

warburgii
Flora of Australia
Plants described in 1821
Taxa named by Carl Christian Mez